Connecticut's 46th House of Representatives district elects one member of the Connecticut House of Representatives. It encompasses parts of Norwich and has been represented by Democrat Emmett Riley since 2013.

Recent elections

2020

2018

2016

2014

2012

References

46